The 2011 Major League Lacrosse season was the 11th season of the league. The season began on May 14, 2011, and concluded with the championship game on August 28, 2011.

Milestones & events

Team movement
The Chicago Machine moved to Rochester, NY and reestablished the Rochester Rattlers franchise. Hamilton, ON became the new home of the Nationals, and the team reflected it with a name change to the Hamilton Nationals.

On December 9, 2010, Commissioner David Gross, announced that in February 2011, there would be two expansion teams created for the 2012 MLL Season. Also, there would be two more expansion teams for 2013. The long-term goal is to have 16 teams by 2019. There were nineteen sites identified as potential markets including Chicago, Philadelphia, and San Francisco.

Later on January 21, 2011, Commissioner David Gross announced that Charlotte, North Carolina and Columbus, Ohio, had been approved as expansion teams for the 2012 season. Gross also announced that with the adding of two more teams, (to bring the total to eight) the league will return to a fourteen-game season in 2012.

Standings 

W = Wins, L = Losses, PCT = Winning Percentage, GB = Games Back of first place, GF = Goals For, 2ptGF = 2 point Goals For, GA = Goals Against, 2ptGA = 2 point Goals Against

Final

Denver defeated Hamilton twice during the regular season.

All Star Game 
Team Warrior 21-20 Team Authority on July 9, 2011, at Harvard Stadium. Michael Kimmel (Team Warrior) was named MVP of the game.

Playoffs
The 2011 New Balance MLL Championship Weekend took place on Saturday and Sunday, August 27 and 28 at Navy–Marine Corps Memorial Stadium in Annapolis, Maryland during Hurricane Irene. Jordan Burke of Boston was the MVP of the MLL Championship.

Annual awards

References 

11
Major League Lacrosse